Eirik Salsten  (born 17 June 1994) is a Norwegian ice hockey player who is currently playing for Storhamar of the GET-ligaen.

Salsten was selected to compete at the 2018 Winter Olympics as a member of the Norway men's national ice hockey team.

Career statistics

Regular season and playoffs

International

References

External links

1994 births
Living people
Ice hockey players at the 2018 Winter Olympics
Manglerud Star Ishockey players
Norwegian ice hockey centres
Olympic ice hockey players of Norway
Ice hockey people from Oslo
Storhamar Dragons players
Stavanger Oilers players
Vålerenga Ishockey players